Contemporary literature is literature which is generally set after World War II in the English-speaking world. Subgenres of contemporary literature include contemporary romance.

History
Literary movements are always contemporary to the writer discussing the work of her day. Here what have been recently "contemporary" are listed by decade. The list should not be assumed to be comprehensive.

1930s
 Objectivist poets

1940s

1950s
 Beat Generation
 Black Mountain poets
 Confessional poetry
 New York School

1960s
 British Poetry Revival
 New Wave (science fiction)
 Nouveau roman

1970s
 L=A=N=G=U=A=G=E poets

1980s
 Cyberpunk
 Maximalism
 New Formalism
 Poetry slam

1990s
 Post cyber punk

2000s
 New Weird

2010s
Fanfic

2020s

See also
 in literature
Modernist literature
Postmodern literature
 Twentieth-century English literature
20th century in literature
2000s in books

 
History of literature